Premio Lo Nuestro 2012 was held on Thursday February 16, 2012 at the American Airlines Arena and was broadcast live on the Univision Network. The nominees were announced on December 1, 2011, during a live televised show "Gala de Nominados", hosted by Raúl De Molina and Lili Estefan from El Gordo y la Flaca on Univision Network.

Special awards
Lifetime Achievement Award (Premio Lo Nuestro a la Excelencia)
Pepe Aguilar
Special Career Achievement Award (Trayectoria Artista del año)
 Don Francisco

Nominees and winners

General

Pop

Rock

Tropical

Regional Mexican

Urban

Video

References

External links
 official Site Premio Lo Nuestro
 Official list of nominations

Lo Nuestro Awards by year
2012 music awards
2012 in Florida
2012 in Latin music
2010s in Miami